Four on the Floor is the fourth EP by Australian punk rock band The Living End. It was released in February 2004, seven years after their previous EP, Second Solution / Prisoner of Society, which had spent a record-breaking 69 weeks on the Australian ARIA Charts Top 50.

Track listing

Personnel
Chris Cheney - guitars and vocals
Scott Owen - double bass and backing vocals
Travis Demsey - drums and backing vocals

References

2003 EPs
The Living End albums